Joel Rand Matheson (born February 18, 1930) is a former lawyer, business owner and political figure in Nova Scotia. He represented Halifax Bedford Basin in the Nova Scotia House of Assembly from 1978 to 1993 as a Progressive Conservative.

Early life and education
He was born in Halifax, Nova Scotia, the son of Rand Matheson, and was educated in Moncton, New Brunswick, at St. Francis Xavier University and finally graduating with an LL.B. from Dalhousie University in 1954.

Political career
Matheson served in the provincial cabinet as Minister of Finance, Minister of Mines and Energy, Minister of Health and Attorney General. He was defeated by Gerry Fogarty when he ran for reelection in 1993. Also in 1993, Matheson ran unsuccessfully in the federal riding of Halifax West as a Progressive Conservative, losing to Geoff Regan.

In 2009, he was named chairman of the board of directors for Canasur Gold.

Personal life
In 1953, he married Ruth MacRobert.

References 

1930 births
Progressive Conservative Association of Nova Scotia MLAs
Living people
Members of the Executive Council of Nova Scotia
People from Bedford, Nova Scotia
People from Halifax, Nova Scotia
Nova Scotia Ministers of Health
Nova Scotia candidates for Member of Parliament